Ho Dam (March 6, 1929 – May 11, 1991) was a North Korean politician, and Foreign Minister from 1970 to 1983.

Ho was a member of the ruling Politburo of North Korea's Communist Party, was also chairman of the Committee for the Peaceful Reunification of the Fatherland, which made nominal efforts to reunite the Communist North with the capitalist South.

As Foreign Minister in 1977, he became the first senior North Korean official to visit the United States. He left the Foreign Minister's job in 1983 and became secretary of the Workers' Party of Korea. In 1980, he accompanied President Kim Il-Sung to Belgrade, Yugoslavia for the funeral of the Yugoslav leader Josip Broz Tito (1892-1980).

In 1990 he was named chairman of the Foreign Affairs Committee of the Supreme People's Assembly, North Korea's parliament.

Ho Dam died on May 11, 1991, from a long illness, according to KCNA. The news agency did not specify the cause of death.

References 

1991 deaths
Foreign ministers of North Korea
People from North Hamgyong
1929 births
Members of the 6th Politburo of the Workers' Party of Korea
Alternate members of the 6th Politburo of the Workers' Party of Korea
Members of the 5th Central Committee of the Workers' Party of Korea
Members of the 6th Central Committee of the Workers' Party of Korea